is a passenger railway station located in the city of  Katsuura, Chiba Prefecture, Japan operated by the East Japan Railway Company (JR East).

Lines

Station layout
The station consists of a single side platforms serving bidirectional traffic. The station is unattended.

History
Namegawa Island Station was opened as a seasonal station on 2 July 1970 to cater to the summer tourist traffic to the nearby Namegawa Island Amusement Park. A number of express trains began stopping at the station from 18 July 1970. The station was upgraded to a year-around station from 1 April 1987, and was made unattended at the same time. The station was absorbed into the JR East network upon the privatization of the Japan National Railways (JNR) on 1 April 1987. The station became a kan'i itaku station in 1990. With the closure of the Namekawa Island Amusement Park on 31 August 2001, the station was again unattended, and express trains services were discontinued. The station building was remodeled in January 2008.

Passenger statistics
In fiscal 2006, the station was used by an average of 19 passengers daily (boarding passengers only).

Surrounding area

See also
 List of railway stations in Japan

References

External links

 JR East Station information 

Railway stations in Japan opened in 1970
Railway stations in Chiba Prefecture
Sotobō Line
Katsuura, Chiba